Jean Freeman (1950-2010) was an American Swimming coach. She was the Women's Swimming Head Coach at the University of Minnesota for 31 years, from 1973 to 2004. Freeman was coach of Minnesota's women's Swimming team when the school's UM's women's athletics program started in 1975.

She coached the Golden Gophers to two Big Ten titles (1999, 2000) and was named the Big Ten's Women's Coach of the Year four times. She was inducted in the American Swimming Coaches Association's Hall of Fame in 2011.

On December 6, 2014, the University of Minnesota renamed the Aquatic Center the Jean K Freeman Aquatic Center.

Freeman swam for Minnesota from 1968 to 1972, and graduated from the school in 1973.

References

1940 births
2010 deaths
American swimming coaches